The TCR Europe Touring Car Series is an annual touring car racing event that is held at various locations across Europe. The series is run in accordance with the TCR Touring Car regulations with production-based cars that are front-wheel drive and powered by 2.0-litre turbocharged engines.

History
On 15 October 2015, Marcello Lotti revealed plans for a European Series including one round from each TCR European championship (Italy, Spain, Germany, Portugal, Russia and Benelux), starting from 2016. On 26 February 2016, the European Trophy was launched, with six rounds (Spanish championship was excluded for not having an own series and Benelux series had two rounds). Subsequent change was made during the course of the season to include additional round from the German series.

In 2017, the one-off event format with two races was adopted. For 2018, it was upgraded to TCR Europe Series with seven events, five of which were run in support of the International GT Open. In 2019, the series continued to have seven events all over Europe with approximately 30 cars and was run in support of the International GT Open. Due to the COVID-19 pandemic, the start of the 2020 season was postponed to the end of August and the series was run with support from the SRO Organization with a starting grid of 25 cars.

In 2022, the series plans to run two events in support of the Deutsche Tourenwagen Masters.

Champions

References

External links
 

TCR Series
European auto racing series
2016 establishments in Europe